Propionate kinase (PduW, TdcD, propionate/acetate kinase) is an enzyme with systematic name ATP:propanoate phosphotransferase. This enzyme catalyses the following chemical reaction

 ATP + propanoate  ADP + propanoyl phosphate

This enzyme requires Mg2+.

References

External links 
 

EC 2.7.2